Atle Hamar (born 23 June 1963) is a Norwegian politician for the Liberal Party.

From 1988 to 1990 he was the leader of the Young Liberals of Norway, the youth wing of the Liberal Party. He was a member of Jølster municipal council and Sogn og Fjordane county council.

In 1997, during the first cabinet Bondevik, he was appointed political advisor in the Ministry of Transport and Communications under Minister Odd Einar Dørum. When Dørum changed ministry to the Ministry of Justice and the Police in 1999, Hamar followed. He was soon promoted to state secretary, and held this position until the first cabinet Bondevik fell in March 2000.

Instead he was appointed director of the Norwegian Gaming Authority. In 2006 he was elected chair of the International Association of Gaming Regulators.

References

1963 births
Living people
Liberal Party (Norway) politicians
Norwegian state secretaries
Sogn og Fjordane politicians
Directors of government agencies of Norway